The Antonia Fortress (Aramaic: קצטרא דאנטוניה) was a citadel built by Herod the Great and named for Herod's patron Mark Antony, as a fortress whose chief function was to protect the Second Temple. It was built in Jerusalem at the eastern end of the so-called Second Wall, at the north-western corner of the Temple Mount.

History
Herod (r. 37 – c. 4 BCE) built the fortress to protect the Temple. He named it for his patron Mark Antony (83–30 BCE).
The fortress housed some part of the Roman garrison of Jerusalem. The Romans also stored the high priest's vestments within the fortress.

The fortress was one of the last strongholds of the Jews in the Siege of Jerusalem (70 CE), when the Second Temple was destroyed.

Construction date controversy
The construction date is controversial because the name suggests that Herod built Antonia before the defeat of Mark Antony by Octavian in 31-30 BCE and Mark Antony's suicide in 30 BCE. Herod is famous for being an apt diplomat and pragmatist, who always aligned himself with the winning side and the "man in charge" of Rome. It is somewhat difficult to bring this date in accordance with the presumed date for the construction of the Herodian Temple.

Christian tradition
Traditionally, Christians have believed for centuries that the vicinity of the Antonia Fortress was the site of Pontius Pilate' praetorium, where Jesus was tried for high treason. This was based on the assumption that an area of Roman flagstones discovered beneath the Church of the Condemnation and the Convent of the Sisters of Zion was 'the pavement' which  describes as the location of Jesus' trial.

Antonia pavement: archaeological counter-arguments
Pierre Benoit, former professor of New Testament studies at the École Biblique, reexamined the results of all previous surveys of the north-western escarpment of the Haram, of the archaeological studies of the sites owned by the Catholics in the area (Convent of the Sisters of Zion, Flagellation Monastery and St Anne Convent of the White Fathers), as well as the digs north of the Struthion Pool area, and published in 1971 his conclusions: Archaeological investigation indicates that about a century after the presumed time of Jesus' death, this area was rebuilt as the eastern of two forums belonging to the new city initiated by Hadrian in around 130 CE, the Aelia Capitolina, and it is conceivable that following the destruction of the Antonia Fortress during the siege of 70 CE, its pavement tiles were reused at Hadrian's forum. However, he also considers the possibility that the pavement is from Hadrian's time altogether. The eastern forum of the Aelia Capitolina was built over the Struthion Pool, which was mentioned by first-century historian Josephus as being adjacent to the fortress (Josephus, Jewish War 5:11:4).

Praetorium at royal palace, not at Antonia
There are textual and archaeological arguments against the trial of Jesus being carried out at the Antonia Fortress. Like Philo, Josephus testifies that the Roman governors stayed in Herod's Palace while they were in Jerusalem, and carried out their trials on the pavement immediately outside it (Josephus, Jewish Wars, 2:14:8). Josephus indicates that Herod's Palace is on the Western Hill (Jewish Wars, 5:2) and in 2001 some of its vestiges were rediscovered under a corner of the Tower of David. Archaeologists therefore conclude that in the first century, the praetorium—the residence of the praefectus (governor)—was in the former royal palace on the Western Hill, rather than at the Antonia Fortress, on the opposite side of the city. However, as the tradition retained its power in associating the fortress with Jesus' trial, the place where it once stood serves as the starting point of the Via Dolorosa commemorating the crucifixion of Jesus.

Description
Although modern reconstructions often depict the fortress as having a tower at each of four corners, Josephus repeatedly refers to it as "the tower Antonia", and states that it had been built by John Hyrcanus and later by King Herod, and used for a vestry, in which were reposited the vestments of the high priest. Josephus states:

The general appearance of the whole was that of a tower with other towers at each of the four corners; three of these turrets were fifty cubits high, while that at the south-east angle rose to seventy cubits and so commanded a view of the whole area of the temple.

Some archaeologists are also of the opinion that the fortress consisted only of a single tower, located at the south-east corner of the site. For example, Pierre Benoit writes that there is absolutely no archaeological support for there having been four towers.

Josephus attests to the importance of the Antonia: "For if the Temple lay as a fortress over the city, Antonia dominated the Temple & the occupants of that post were the guards of all three." Josephus placed the Antonia at the northwest corner of the colonnades surrounding the Temple. Modern depictions often show the Antonia as being located along the north side of the Temple enclosure.

Other theories
Some researchers and academics, including Marilyn Sams (M.A. in American Literature, Brigham Young University) and Dr. Robert Cornuke (Ph.D. in Bible and Theology, Louisiana Baptist University), have expanded on research by Dr. Ernest L. Martin (1932–2002, meteorologist, college professor, amateur archeologist), who offered evidence that the compound on what is commonly called the Temple Mount did not house the Jerusalem Temple, but is instead the remnants of a more massive Antonia Fortress, and that the rock inside the Dome of the Rock is not the Foundation Stone, but was inside the Praetorium of Pontius Pilate where Jesus was judged.

Jerome Murphy-O'Connor, however, argued that this theory "cannot be sustained", as it cannot be reconciled with Josephus' description, and it "does not account for the archaeological remains in the western section of the north wall". Josephus and archaeology don't leave much space for doubt in regard to the fact that the Temple Mount was indeed the site of the Herodian Temple, nor for the location of the Antonia near its north-western corner.

Both Josephus and archaeology concur that the Roman military camp after the 70 CE destruction was centered on the three towers next to Herod's royal palace on the Western Hill, and not on the Temple Mount, whose protective walls had been thrown down by the Romans, with the resulting debris visible until today along the Western Wall near Robinson's Arch. Roman military camps had rounded corners and four gates, one in each wall – the Herodian compound had angular corners and nine gates. Permanent camps were much larger, 50 acres on average; the Haram esplanade only contains 36 acres. There is no Roman camp explanation for the Hebrew inscription marking the  Trumpeting Place. The Temple compound was surrounded by porticos (roofed colonnades following the inner walls of the compound), while military camps never were. Augustus trusted Herod and would not have built a controlling fortress towering over his capital and Temple, but no emperor would have gone so far as to entrust a legion to a client king.

Remains of a 4-metre thick wall and Herodian-style ashlars are still observable inside the Mamluk buildings in the north-west corner of the Haram and the adjacent area along its northern wall. Together they suggest the dimensions of the Antonia: 112 by 40 metres on the outside, signifying a 3300 square metre floor area, absolutely enough for a small garrison, but certainly not for the entire legion suggested by Martin.

Antonia did stand on a rocky outcrop, as written by Josephus, but here, as elsewhere in his writings, he did exaggerate its elevation above the surrounding ground. This still meant that the fortress dominated the Temple courts and porticos, the latter by over ten metres, matching Josephus' words: "the tower of Antonia lay at the angle where the two porticos, the western and the northern, of the first court of the Temple met" (JW 5:238), and "[a]t the point where the Antonia impinged on the porticos of the temple there were stairs leading down to both of them by which the guards descended" (JW 5:243; cf. ). The position and dimensions of those porticos can still be in part discerned, thanks to three surviving roof beam sockets carved out of the living rock of the rocky outcrop which once held the Antonia, north-west of the esplanade. Josephus' statement that all the porticos surrounding the Temple complex measured six stadia "including the Antonia" (JW 5:192) is off by a large margin (six stadia represent about 1.11 km, whereas the sides of the Haram esplanade today measure together about 1.55 km), but it clearly suggests that the fortress was contiguous with the Temple complex with no need for a "double causeway" to connect the two by spanning a distance of one stade (c. 150 m), as claimed by Martin.

See also
Bezetha
Church of Ecce Homo
Hasmonean Baris
Herodian architecture

References
Footnotes

Citations

External links

19 BC
Buildings and structures completed in the 1st century BC
1st-century BC establishments in Judea
Jews and Judaism in the Roman Empire
Ancient sites in Jerusalem
Archaeological sites in Israel
Architectural history
Former buildings and structures in Israel
Forts in Israel
Herod the Great
Ancient history of Jerusalem
Temple Mount
1st-century BC fortifications
Pontius Pilate